Wadki  is a village in the southern state of Karnataka, India. It is located in the Gangawati taluk of Koppal district in Karnataka.

See also
Koppal
Districts of Karnataka

References

External links

Villages in Koppal district